David Pretot (born 1969) is a retired French alpine skier.

He competed in the slalom event at the 1987 Junior World Championships, finishing 7th. He later competed in the downhill and super-G events exclusively, including a lowly 44th-place finish at the 1996 World Championships.

He made his World Cup debut in January 1992 in Garmisch-Partenkirchen, also collecting his first World Cup points with a 20th place. He improved to 9th in January 1994 in Saalbach-Hinterglemm. After that, his best placement was an 11th place. His last World Cup outing came in January 2000 in Chamonix.

He represented the sports club CS Megeve.

References 

1969 births
Living people
French male alpine skiers